The 2016 season is IFK Mariehamn's 12th Veikkausliiga season since their promotion back to the top flight in 2005.

Squad

Transfers

Winter

In:

Out:

Summer

In:

Out:

Competitions

Veikkausliiga

League table

Results summary

Results by matchday

Results

Finnish Cup

League Cup

UEFA Europa League

Qualifying rounds

Squad statistics

Appearances and goals

|-
|colspan="14"|Trialists:
|-
|colspan="14"|Players who left IFK Mariehamn during the season:
|}

Goal scorers

Disciplinary record

References

External links
Official website

IFK Mariehamn seasons
IFK Mariehamn